Peter James William Young (born 14 September 1986) is an English former first-class cricketer.

Young was born at Hammersmith in September 1986. He was educated at Wellington College, before going up to Oxford Brookes University. While studying at Oxford Brookes, he played first-class cricket for Oxford UCCE in 2006–08, making nine appearances. Young scored 280 runs in his nine matches, at an average of 23.33 and with a high score of 54, his only first-class half century. With his right-arm medium-fast, he took 4 wickets with best figures of 1 for 26. His brother, Ed, also played first-class cricket.

Notes and references

External links

1986 births
Living people
People from Hammersmith
People educated at Wellington College, Berkshire
Alumni of Oxford Brookes University
English cricketers
Oxford MCCU cricketers